Katia Winter (born 13 October 1983) is a Swedish actress. She is best known for her roles as Nadia in the Showtime series Dexter (2012), Katrina Crane in the Fox series Sleepy Hollow (2013–15), Freydís Eiríksdóttir in The CW series Legends of Tomorrow (2017–18) and Gwen Karlsson in the CBS/Paramount+ series Blood & Treasure (2019–2023).

Life
Winter was born in Stockholm, Sweden. After graduating high school, she moved to London to study at a stage school. She moved to Los Angeles, California in the early 2010s.

In 2013, Winter married musician Jesse Glick. They separated in June 2015, and she filed for divorce in February 2016.

In 2020, she moved back to Sweden with her British boyfriend. They reside in the countryside, a few hours north of Stockholm.

Career
Winter appeared on British television series and in films including the 2009 drama Unmade Beds and the 2011 drama Everywhere and Nowhere.

After making a move to the U.S. she immediately booked the lead female role in Arena opposite Kellan Lutz and Samuel L. Jackson. Soon after she played the lead role in the 2012 independent film Love Sick Love alongside Matthew Settle and in the 2013 independent film Banshee Chapter with Ted Levine.

In 2012 she appeared in the NCIS episode "Need To Know". In the same year she also joined the cast of Dexter for the show's seventh season, playing the recurring role of Nadia, a Russian stripper who works in a Miami club.

From 2013 to 2015, Winter starred as Katrina Crane on the Fox series Sleepy Hollow.

Filmography

Film

Television films

Television series

References

External links
 

1983 births
Actresses from Stockholm
Expatriate actresses in the United Kingdom
Expatriate actresses in the United States
Living people
Swedish film actresses
Swedish television actresses